Acorn Records was a short-lived American record label, created in 1950, which issued several singles by notable musical artists.

History
The label was formed in 1950. It was created by Herman Lubinsky in order to utilize distribution channels apart from its parent company, Savoy. Nevertheless Savoy was listed as the selling agent. The label ceased production by the end of 1951.

Artists
 Tommy Brown
 Carolina Slim
 Erroll Garner
 John Lee Hooker (as "The Boogie Man")
 Patterson Singers
 Jimmy Scott (as "Little Jimmy")
 Hal Singer
 Sir Charles Thompson

References

Defunct record labels of the United States
Record labels established in 1950
Record labels disestablished in 1951